Nikolai Kornhass (born 28 March 1993) is a German Paralympic judoka. He represented Germany at the 2016 Summer Paralympics held in Rio de Janeiro, Brazil and he won a bronze medal in the men's 73 kg event.

At the 2015 IBSA European Judo Championships he won a bronze medal in the men's 73 kg event.

He won the gold medal at the 2019 IBSA European Judo Championships in the men's 73 kg event.

References

External links 
 

1993 births
Living people
German male judoka
Paralympic judoka of Germany
Paralympic bronze medalists for Germany
Paralympic medalists in judo
Place of birth missing (living people)
Judoka at the 2016 Summer Paralympics
Medalists at the 2016 Summer Paralympics
21st-century German people